The 2014–15 South Carolina Gamecocks men's basketball team represented the University of South Carolina during the 2014–15 NCAA Division I men's basketball season. The team's head coach was Frank Martin, who was in his third season at South Carolina. The team played their home games at the Colonial Life Arena in Columbia, South Carolina as a member of the Southeastern Conference. They finished the season 17–16, 6–12 in SEC play to finish in a tie for 11th place. They advanced to the quarterfinals of the SEC tournament where they lost to Georgia.

Before the season

Departures

Recruits

Roster

Schedule and results
Source: 

|-
!colspan=9 style="background:#73000A; color:#FFFFFF;"| Exhibition

|-
!colspan=9 style="background:#73000A; color:#FFFFFF;"| Non-conference games

|-
!colspan=9 style="background:#73000A; color:#FFFFFF;"| Conference games

|-
!colspan=9 style="background:#73000A; color:#FFFFFF;" | SEC tournament

See also
 2014–15 South Carolina Gamecocks women's basketball team

References

South Carolina Gamecocks men's basketball seasons
South Carolina
Game
Game